Beit Oved (lit. House of Worker or House of Obed) is a moshav in central Israel. Located on the outskirts of Ness Ziona, it falls under the jurisdiction of Gan Raveh Regional Council.

Etymology
The name is based on one of two biblical passages:And the ark of God remained with the family of Obed-edom in his house three months; and the LORD blessed the house of Obed-edom, and all that he had. (1 Chronicles 13:14) or:
He that tilleth his ground shall have plenty of bread; but he that followeth after vain things is void of understanding. (Proverbs 12:11)

History
The moshav was founded in 1933 by a group of veteran farmers. It was established as part of the Settlement of the Thousand plan,  a response to the 1929 Palestine riots in which small farm settlements were built on the outskirts of Jewish towns and moshavot to improve security.

Notable residents
David Tabak (1927–2012), Olympic runner

References

Moshavim
Populated places established in 1933
Jewish villages in Mandatory Palestine
Populated places in Central District (Israel)
1933 establishments in Mandatory Palestine